Juuka is a municipality of Finland. It is located in the North Karelia region.
is water.

The municipality is unilingually Finnish.

Geography  
Juuka as a whole consists of 20 villages. The large expanse of Juuka consists of:

 Ahmovaara
 Halivaara (Hali)
 Juuka
 Kannas
 Kajoo
 Kuhnusta
 Larinsaari
 Matara
 Nunnanlahti
 Paalasmaa
 Petrovaara
 Pihlajavaara
 Polvela
 Raholanvaara (Rahola)
 Timovaara
 Tuopanjoki
 Vaikko
 Vihtasuo
 Vuokko

The neighboring municipalities of Juuka are Kuopio, Kaavi, Kontiolahti, Lieksa, Nurmes, Polvijärvi and Rautavaara. The former neighboring municipalities are the Nurmes rural municipality, which was annexed to Nurmes in 1973, Pielisjärvi, which was also connected to Lieksa in 1973, and Säyneinen, which was annexed to Juankoski in 1971; Juankoski, on the other hand, was connected to Kuopio in 2017.

Etymology
Juuka means a river that flows through a lake The village of Juuka dates back to the 16th century. In the late 19th century, settlements began to settle along the roads and shops were established by the banks of the Lake Pielinen. 

The parish of Juuka was initially a prayer room separated from the parts of the parishes of Pielisjärvi and Nurmes, and its own parish from 1873. The present church was completed in the 1850s, but was preceded by two earlier churches.

Juuan Elli 
Ellinpäivät is a scenario where in four days different associations, communities and companies arrange events to each day. To get information about these events there is some space booked in a newspaper Vaarojen Sanomat. There is info and a timetable for the events. The board selects the people who are in charge of the scenario. Elli means a person that is the figurehead of the scenario and a new figurehead is chosen every year.

The events can be, for example, concerts, market events, the declaring of a new Elli and a new event called “Juuret Juuassa –ryhmän Rehvit”. The event is basically a car show. Many retro cars and their drivers. It's, for that reason, called a nowadays rally for the elder youngsters.

Notable people
 Sakari Timonen
 Erkki Toivanen
 Tuula Peltonen

References

External links

Municipality of Juuka – Official website in Finnish and partly in English and Russian

 
Populated places established in 1868